Philip Mason Garner (born April 30, 1949) is an American former professional baseball player and manager. With the Pirates, he won the 1979 World Series over the Baltimore Orioles.

Baseball career
Garner was originally drafted out of The University of Tennessee by the Montreal Expos in the eighth round of the 1970 Major League Baseball draft, but did not sign. Seven months later, he was the third overall pick by the Oakland Athletics in the secondary January 1971 draft. Originally a third baseman when he signed with the Athletics, he was converted to a second baseman as the Athletics had perennial All-Star Sal Bando at third. Garner won two World Series during his time in Oakland in 1973 and 1974. Spending most of his time as a bench player and in the minor leagues. He had a break out year for Oakland in 1976 in which he hit 8 home runs and 74 RBI's that year. He was named an All Star that year the first of his career. He stole a career high 35 bases that year.

Before the 1977 season, the Athletics traded Garner, Chris Batton, and Tommy Helms to the Pittsburgh Pirates for Tony Armas, Rick Langford, Doug Bair, Dave Giusti, Doc Medich, and Mitchell Page.

Nicknamed "Scrap-Iron" due to his gritty style of play, Garner's best year as a player was in  when he hit 17 HR's, had 77 RBI's, stole 32 bases, hit 35 doubles, and scored 99 runs. His icon at the time was the scrappy, similarly-mustachioed cartoon hero, Yosemite Sam. He was named an All Star again in 1980 batting .259 while hitting 5 home runs and 58 RBI's while stealing 32 bases. He was named an All Star again for a third and final time in his career the next season in 1981 though his stats declined from previous years. He hit just 1 home run while having 26 RBI's on the year and had just 10 stolen bases.

On August 31, 1981, Garner was traded from the Pirates to the Astros for second baseman Johnny Ray and pitcher Randy Niemann. He would play with Houston until 1987. He helped the Astros reach the 1986 NLCS where they lost in six games to New York Mets this would be his final postseason action he would see of his career. He was traded in 1987 to the Los Angeles Dodgers and then spent a year with San Francisco Giants in 1988. He went through 1989 without signing with anybody and announced his retirement a year later in 1990.

Managerial career
Garner later became a manager for the Milwaukee Brewers, Detroit Tigers and Houston Astros, leading the Astros to the franchise's first ever World Series in 2005.

In 1992, Garner replaced Tom Trebelhorn as manager of the Brewers. He quickly installed a running-focused style of play as every starter that year stole at least 10 bases. Standing out were 1992 AL Rookie of the Year Pat Listach who stole 54 bases, veteran Paul Molitor stealing 31 (doing so in his final season with the team), and outfielder Darryl Hamilton stealing 41. He led the team to a nine game improvement from the previous year and led the Brewers to second place in the American League East Division, losing out by four games to the eventual world champion Toronto Blue Jays. However, it would be the last time until 2007 that the team would finish above .500. Garner would lead them to more than 80 losses in four of his six full seasons spent with the team. He was fired in the midst of a 1999 season that saw them at 52-60 (Jim Lefebvre would replace him and go 22-27 to close out the year).

During a July 22, 1995 game against the Chicago White Sox, Garner was involved in a bench-clearing brawl, exchanging blows with White Sox manager Terry Bevington in a rare skipper-on-skipper fistfight.  Garner, along with Bevington, was suspended four games for the fracas.

In 2000, Garner was hired to manage the Tigers, in their inaugural season at Comerica Park.  The Tigers were in contention for the American League Wild Card berth for much of the season, but faded and finished 79-83.  Garner didn't manage a winning season in his years in Detroit, and when his 2002 team began the season 0-6, he and general manager Randy Smith were fired, with Luis Pujols as Garner's replacement; Pujols would lose 100 games in his only season.

The 2004 season was different for Garner. After the Houston Astros had a mediocre start under then-manager Jimy Williams having a 44–44 record in the first half of the season, Garner was brought in after the All-Star break to replace Williams and led the Astros to a National League Wild Card berth, eventually losing in seven games to the St. Louis Cardinals in the National League Championship Series. The team experienced another slow start in 2005, losing 30 of their first 45 games, but made a run once again late in the season and came back to win another National League Wild Card, bolstered by the pitching talents of Roger Clemens and Andy Pettitte, each of whom arrived in 2004. This time, Houston would beat the St. Louis Cardinals in the National League Championship Series in six games and win the pennant only to be swept by the Chicago White Sox in the World Series.

Under his leadership in the last twelve games of the 2006 season, the Astros won ten of twelve but lost out on a division title by a game and half. Garner's contract was extended through the end of the 2008 season by the Astros. As manager of a pennant winning team the year before, Garner managed the 2006 National League All-Star Team in Pittsburgh on July 11, .  Garner cites Chuck Tanner, his manager during his time with the Pirates, as one of his biggest coaching influences.

The Astros went into a tailspin in 2007, owing to the aging talent on their roster (Jeff Bagwell had retired in 2005 while Craig Biggio played his last season in 2007 to go with no Clemens or Pettitte, who each left for New York after 2006). On August 27, Phil Garner was released by the Astros along with general manager Tim Purpura with the team having a record of 58-73. Cecil Cooper was named interim manager for the remainder of the season.

In 2010, Garner admitted to using a corked bat against pitcher Gaylord Perry and that he hit a home run with it.

Career MLB statistics
In 1860 games over 16 seasons, Garner posted a .260 batting average (1594-for-6136) with 780 runs, 299 doubles, 82 triples, 109 home runs, 738 RBI, 225 stolen bases, 564 bases on balls, .323 on-base percentage and .389 slugging percentage. He finished his career with an overall .965 fielding percentage playing at second and third base and shortstop. In 21 postseason games, he batted .309 (21-for-68) with 10 runs, 5 doubles, 1 triple, 1 home run, 8 RBI and 8 walks.

Managerial record

Post-MLB career
In 2008, Phil Garner served as interim head coach for the UHV Jaguars baseball team of the University of Houston–Victoria.  Garner temporarily replaced former Astros teammate Terry Puhl while he fulfilled his obligation as manager of the Canada National baseball team.

On August 11, 2011, Garner agreed to re-join the Athletics as a Special Adviser. He returned for the 2012 season in the same position.

Trivia
On September 15, 1978, Garner became one of only a handful of Major League players to hit a grand slam in consecutive games.
Garner, when playing for the Oakland Athletics, got the club's 10,000th hit, doing so on June 27, 1975 on a double off Andy Hassler in Anaheim.
Garner is one of only five managers to have won a league pennant without ever having won a division title (Clint Hurdle, Dave Martinez, Jack McKeon, and Bobby Valentine are the others).
Garner is one of three managers to have lost 1,000 games while not winning 1,000. With 2,040 games managed, he ranks as having the most games managed for anyone without 1,000 wins.

Garner has been involved in some of the longest post-season games in the history of baseball.

In the 1986 NLCS, the 16-inning loss to the New York Mets on October 15, Garner was the starting third baseman for the Astros, going 1-for-3, before being replaced by a pinch-hitter.
In the 2005 NLDS against the Atlanta Braves, he was the Astros' manager in their 18-inning victory on October 9, .
Two weeks later in the 2005 World Series, he managed the Astros for the longest World Series game in length of time (five hours and forty-one minutes). The Chicago White Sox won the game, 7-5 in the 14th inning (tied for longest by innings).

References

External links
, or Retrosheet 
Career managerial record Baseball-Reference.com

1949 births
Living people
American League All-Stars
Baseball players from Tennessee
Birmingham A's players
Burlington Bees players
Detroit Tigers managers
Houston Astros coaches
Houston Astros managers
Houston Astros players
Iowa Oaks players
Los Angeles Dodgers players
Major League Baseball second basemen
Major League Baseball third basemen
Milwaukee Brewers managers
Minor league baseball managers
National League All-Stars
Oakland Athletics players
People from Jefferson City, Tennessee
Phoenix Firebirds players
Pittsburgh Pirates players
San Francisco Giants players
Tennessee Volunteers baseball players
Tigres de Aragua players
American expatriate baseball players in Venezuela
Tucson Toros players
UHV Jaguars baseball coaches